Goodbye Cruel World is a 1992 British drama starring Sue Johnston, Alun Armstrong and Brenda Bruce. The three-part series was aired on BBC Two during January 1992 and was aired again in summer 1993. Johnston played the character of Barbara Grade, a woman who is diagnosed with a terminal degenerative illness, and the series focused on how Barbara and her family and friends deal with her worsening condition. It was written by Tony Marchant and directed by Adrian Shergold and was nominated for Best Drama at the 1993 British Academy Television Awards.

Cast

Sue Johnston – Barbara Grade
Alun Armstrong – Roy Grade
Brenda Bruce – Marjory
Jonny Lee Miller – Mark
Eric Allan – Michael
Oliver Ford Davies – Collins
Mick Ford – Spector
Will Knightley – Cheevers
Rosalind March – Mary
Lucy Meacock – Julia
Louisa Milwood-Haigh – Sally
Julian Wadham – Gavin Kaye

External links

1992 British television series debuts
1992 British television series endings
1990s British drama television series
BBC television dramas
1990s British television miniseries
English-language television shows